The Derby del Sole (or the Derby of the Sun in English), also known as Derby del Sud, is an Italian football derby between Napoli and Roma. The two clubs are considered the most popular outside of Northern Italy (the heart of Italian football); Roma being from Central Italy and Napoli from Southern Italy.

Statistics

Updated 29 January 2023

Below are the overall statistics for games between Napoli and Roma in official matches.

Results

 SF = Semi-final
 QF = Quarter-final
 R16 = Round of 16
 R32 = Round of 32
 GS = Group stage
 R1 = Round 1
 R2 = Round 2

Head-to-head ranking in Serie A (1930–2022)

• Total: Napoli with 39 higher finishes, Roma with 37 higher finishes (as of the end of the 2021–22 season).

Notes:
 Both teams qualified for the final round of 8 teams in 1946

References

A.S. Roma
S.S.C. Napoli
Sole
Football in Rome
Football in Naples